Allenford may refer to:

Allenford, Ontario
Justine Allenford
Roger Allenford